Aonach Buidhe (899 m) is a remote mountain in the Northwest Highlands of Ross and Cromarty in northwest Scotland. The nearest village is Dornie.

The usual route is from the southeast which goes through Glen Elchaig.

References

Mountains and hills of the Northwest Highlands
Marilyns of Scotland
Corbetts